Steeltown is the second studio album by Scottish band Big Country. The album was recorded at ABBA's Polar Studios in Stockholm with Steve Lillywhite producing. It was released on 19 October 1984, in the UK and 29 October 1984, in the United States. It was released on CD only in Germany, as well as remastered and reissued there.

Steeltown is the band's only UK number 1 album, topping the chart for 1 week in October 1984. The title track Steeltown was written about the town of Corby, telling how many Scots went to work at the Stewarts & Lloyds steelworks when it opened in 1935, at the height of the Great Depression, but later found themselves unemployed when the steelworks declined in the early 1980s.

The 1996 reissue contains all of the B-sides from the album's single releases as well as the extended version of "Wonderland"

"East of Eden" was the only Top 20 single from the album, reaching number 17 in the UK Singles Chart.

Reception
Critic Fred Schruers of Rolling Stone gave the album a glowing review, writing:

Some critics reacted negatively towards the album, calling it muddled and overly dense. The album's relative failure has been attributed to the fact that many American and international fans couldn't relate to its themes and lyrics, which dealt with the misfortunes of Scottish workers and contained references to British politics. However, many fans today consider Steeltown to be the band's finest work.

James Dean Bradfield from Manic Street Preachers has cited the album as being one of his all-time favourites.

Track listing
All songs written by Stuart Adamson, Mark Brzezicki, Tony Butler, and Bruce Watson except where indicated.

Side One
 "Flame of the West" – 5:01
 "East of Eden" – 4:29
 "Steeltown" – 4:39
 "Where the Rose Is Sown" – 4:58
 "Come Back to Me" – 4:35

Side Two
 "Tall Ships Go" – 4:38
 "Girl with Grey Eyes" – 4:47
 "Rain Dance" – 4:19
 "The Great Divide" – 4:50
 "Just a Shadow" – 5:38

1996 Reissue Bonus Tracks
 "Bass Dance" - 1:39
 "Belief In The Small Man" - 5:17
 "Prairie Rose" - 4:46 (Bryan Ferry, Phil Manzanera)
 "Wonderland (Extended)" - 7:07
 "Winter Sky" - 3:16

2014 30th Anniversary Deluxe Edition Disc 2
 “Wonderland”
 “Giant”
 “All Fall Together”
 "East of Eden (Radio Edit)”
 “Prairie Rose” (Bryan Ferry, Phil Manzanera)
 “Where The Rose Is Sown” (Radio Edit)
 “Belief In The Small Man”
 “Bass Dance”
 “Just A Shadow (Radio Edit)”
 “Winter Sky”
 “Wonderland (Work In Progress #1)”
 “Wonderland (Work In Progress #2)”
 "East of Eden (Rough Mix)”
 “Tall Ships Go (Rough Mix)”
 “Where The Rose Is Sown (Rough Mix)”
 “Come Back To Me (Rough Mix)”
 “Bass Concerto (Work In Progress)”

Personnel
Big Country
Stuart Adamson – guitar, piano, vocals
Mark Brzezicki – drums, percussion, vocals
Tony Butler – bass, vocals
Bruce Watson – guitar, mandolin, sitar, vocals

Charts

Certifications

References 

Big Country albums
1984 albums
Albums produced by Steve Lillywhite
Mercury Records albums
Albums recorded at RAK Studios
Albums recorded at Polar Studios